Zinswiller is a commune in the Bas-Rhin department in Grand Est in north-eastern France. Zinswiller is 40 km from Strasbourg, the department capital, and 384 km from Paris.

Population

See also
 Communes of the Bas-Rhin department

References

Communes of Bas-Rhin